Sir Percy Winn Everett (b. 22 April 1870 Rushmere, Ipswich – 23 February 1952 Elstree) was an editor-in-chief for the publisher C. Arthur Pearson Limited and an active Scouter who became the Deputy Chief Scout of The Boy Scouts Association.<ref name=Sharma>T.C. Sharma, 'Scouting As A Cocurricular, Sarup & Sons, 2003, 265 pages (page 17)</ref>

Everett first met Robert Baden-Powell in 1906 when assigned by Arthur Pearson to support Baden-Powell in writing Scouting for Boys. Everett participated for a day in the Brownsea Island Scout camp in 1907.

Everett, already well involved in Scouting and living in Elstree, became the first Scoutmaster of the 1st Elstree Scout group on 13 March 1908.

Everett was married in S. Shields in Q2, 1896. On 6 February 1903, they had a daughter called Geraldine Winn Everett (affectionately referred to as "Winn"). Her godfather was the noted English journalist and writer Bertram Fletcher Robinson. "Winn" became a prominent physician in Elstree where she died on 21 January 1998 aged 94 years.The Sherlock Holmes Journal vol. 29, #2 (Summer 2009), p. 49. Archived at the Wayback Machine.

In 1919, Everett organized the first Wood Badge leadership training in Gilwell Park.

In 1930, Everett was knighted for his service to scouting.

In 1948, Everett wrote The First Ten Years (88 pages), published by the East Anglian Daily Times'', about the first ten years of Scouting.

Baden-Powell conferred the six-bead Wood Badge onto Everett, which he passed on in 1948 to Gilwell Park's Camp Chief John Thurman, to be worn as badge of office by the person responsible for leader training.

See also

References

The Scout Association
1870 births
1953 deaths
Businesspeople from Ipswich
People from Elstree
English publishers (people)